"Domestic Life" is a song written by J.D. Martin and Gary Harrison, and recorded by American country music artist John Conlee.  It was released in February 1987 as the first single from the album American Faces.  The song reached #4 on the Billboard Hot Country Singles & Tracks chart.

Chart performance

References

1987 singles
1987 songs
John Conlee songs
Songs written by Gary Harrison
Columbia Records singles
Songs written by J. D. Martin (songwriter)